The Central Divisional Board of the North American GAA is the governing body of hurling, camogie, and gaelic football in an area centered on Chicago.  It is affiliated to the North American Board, and its territory was expanded in 2006 to include Milwaukee.  Its headquarters are at Gaelic Park, a custom built facility for Gaelic games in the South side of Chicago. The facility has hosted major tournaments such as the North American playoffs.  It hosted the 2007 Continental Youth Championships and the 2007 North American Playoffs.

The Central Divisional Board has 28 registered clubs playing Gaelic football, hurling, ladies Gaelic football, and camogie.

External links
GAA official website
North American Board official website
Continental Youth Championships official website

Irish-American culture in Chicago
Irish-American culture in Illinois
Irish-American culture in Wisconsin
North American GAA
Sports associations based in Chicago
Gaelic games governing bodies in the United States